The 1988 Australian Production Car Championship was a CAMS sanctioned motor racing championship for Group 3E Series Production Cars. It was the second Australian Production Car Championship and the first to be contested over a national series. The championship was won by Gary Waldon, driving a Mazda RX-7.

Calendar
The championship was contested over an eight-round series with one race per round.

Points system
Championship points were awarded on a 20–15–12–10–8–6–4–3–2–1 basis to the top ten finishers in each round.
Each driver could only retain his/her best seven round results towards the championship points totals.

Championship results

Manufacturers Award

Notes and references

Australian Production Car Championship
Production Car Championship